ROCS Kee Lung (基隆, DDG-1801) is the lead ship of her class of guided-missile destroyers currently in active service of Republic of China Navy.

History
While Kee Lung is the lead ship of her class, she was actually not the first ship in her class built. Kee Lung was formerly the American  , which was decommissioned by the United States Navy in 1998. Scott was sold to the Republic of China Navy along with the other three Kidd-class destroyers in 2001. Scott was then renamed to Kee Long was the first of the four ships to be commissioned in the Republic of China Navy which made her the lead ship in the Republic of China Navy. For a period of time Kee Lung was tentatively named Chi Teh (紀德), a transliteration of Kidd into Chinese. But it was later decided to name her after the port of Keelung, a major naval port in northern Taiwan.

Kee Lung, along with her three sister ships, is the largest destroyer and second largest ship in displacement ever in Republic of China Navy service, only smaller than ROCS Hsu Hai (LSD-193), a dock landing ship. Kee Lung was re-fitted for service in the ROCN at Detyen's Shipyard in North Charleston, South Carolina. She was formally commissioned on 17 December 2005 along with sister ship .

Specifications

Kee Lung is the only one of her sister ships to be equipped with LAMPS III system and flight deck strengthened. This enables Kee Lung to carry up to two of the more capable Sikorsky S-70(M)-1/2 Seahawk helicopters for anti-submarine warfare, compared to her sister ships.

External links 
ROCN KEELUNG CLASS DDG

Kidd-class destroyers
Kee Lung-class destroyers
Ships built in Pascagoula, Mississippi
1980 ships
Destroyers of the Republic of China